Sarita Vihar is a Delhi Metro station in Delhi. It is located between Jasola Apollo and Mohan Estate stations on the Violet Line.

History
The station was opened with the first section of the Line on 3 October 2010 in time for the Commonwealth Games opening ceremony on the same day. Until the second section of the Violet Line opened in 2011, it was the terminus for the line.

The station

Station layout

Facilities
The station also houses several ATMs, food kiosks and a book store run by WHSmith.
List of available ATM at Sarita Vihar metro station are HDFC Bank, YES Bank, Canara Bank  nearest college is Asia Pacific Institute of Management

Entry/Exit

See also

Delhi
Sarita Vihar
List of Delhi Metro stations
Transport in Delhi
Delhi Metro Rail Corporation
Delhi Suburban Railway
Delhi Monorail
Delhi Transport Corporation
South East Delhi
New Delhi
National Capital Region (India)
List of rapid transit systems
List of metro systems

References

External links

 Delhi Metro Rail Corporation Ltd. (Official site) 
 Delhi Metro Annual Reports
 
 UrbanRail.Net – Descriptions of all metro systems in the world, each with a schematic map showing all stations.

Delhi Metro stations
Railway stations opened in 2010
Railway stations in South Delhi district